A mandarin square (Chữ Nho: 補子), also known as a rank badge, was a large embroidered badge sewn onto the surcoat of officials in Imperial China (decorating  and ), Korea (decorating the  of the Joseon dynasty), in Vietnam, and the Ryukyu Kingdom. It was embroidered with detailed, colourful animal or bird insignia indicating the rank of the official wearing it. Despite its name, the mandarin square falls into two categories: round  and square .

China 
The history of the square-shaped  is unclear. However, in the Yuan dynasty encyclopaedia Shilin Guangji, as well as contemporary Persian paintings of the Mongol court, there are pictures showing officials wearing clothing with squares on the back, decorated with flora, animals and birds. By the Yuan dynasty, the square-shaped  was already worn as clothing ornaments.

Ming dynasty 

Mandarin squares were first authorized for the wear of officials in the sumptuary laws of 1391 of the Ming dynasty. The use of squares depicting birds for civil officials and animals for military officials was an outgrowth of the use of similar squares, apparently for decorative use, in the Yuan dynasty. The original court dress regulations of the Ming dynasty were published in 1368, but did not refer to badges as rank insignia. These badges continued to be used through the remainder of the Ming and the subsequent Qing dynasty until the imperial system fell in 1912.

Ming nobles and officials wore their rank badges on full-cut red robes with the design stretching from side to side, completely covering the chest and back. This caused the badges to be slightly trapezoidal with the tops narrower than the bottom. The Ming statutes never refer to the number of birds or animals that should appear on the badges. In the beginning, two or three were used. In a typical example of paired birds, they were shown in flight on a background of bright cloud streamers on a gold background. Others showed one bird on the ground with the second in flight. The addition of flowers produced an idealized naturalism.

Qing dynasty 

There was a sharp difference between the Ming and Qing styles of badges: the Qing badges were smaller with a decorative border. And, while the specific birds and animals did not change much throughout their use, the design of the squares underwent an almost continual evolution. According to rank, Qing-dynasty nobles had their respective official clothes. Princes, including Qin Wang and Jun Wang, usually wore black robes as opposed to the blue robes in court, and had four circular designs, one on each shoulder, front, and back, as opposed to the usual front-and-back design. Specifically, princes of the blood used four front-facing dragons, Qin Wang had two front-facing and two side-facing dragons, and Jun Wang had four side-facing ones; all had five claws on each foot. Beile and Beizi had a circular design on their official clothing, the former having two front-facing dragons, the latter two side-facing ones; these dragons had only four claws on each foot, and are referred to as "drakes" or "great serpents" (巨蟒 jù-mǎng). National duke, general, efu, "commoner" duke, marquis and count had two front-facing, four-clawed dragons on square designs, whereas viscount and baron had cranes and golden pheasants, as for mandarins of the first and second class.

Comparative table across dynasties 

The specific birds and animals used to represent rank varied only slightly from the inception of mandarin squares until the end of the Qing dynasty. Officials who held a lower position or did odd jobs used the magpie during the Ming dynasty. Supervising officials used xiezhi. Musicians used the oriole. The following tables show this evolution:

Military

Civil

21st century 
The use of the round-shaped and square-shaped  has been revived in China following the Hanfu movement.

Korea 
Korean rank badge (흉배 in Korean) is a small panel of embroidery that would have served to indicate the status of a government official in the Choson dynasty Korea (1392–1910). Made in the nineteenth century, it shows a pair of black and white leopards, one above the other in opposing stance, surrounded by stylised cloud patterns in pink, purple and pale green upon a blue background. It would have been worn by a military official from the first to third ranks. Leopards and tigers, respected for their strength and courage in Korea, were used for the dress of military officials while civil officials wore crane motifs. This badge shows the distinctively spotted animals among rocks, waves and clouds in a pattern which remained virtually unchanged for 300 years.

Vietnam

See also 
Tablion
Chinese hat knob
Hanfu, Gwanbok, Qizhuang
Nine-rank system, for an earlier system for ranking officials in China
Chinese auspicious ornaments in textile and clothing

References

Further reading 
 "Rank insignia for military officers of the imperial court", in:

External links 
 

Chinese traditional clothing
Chinese inventions
History of Imperial China
Insignia
Korean embroidery
Orders, decorations, and medals of Imperial China
Vietnamese culture
Vietnamese clothing